Below is a list of siteswaps or juggling patterns by siteswap.

Toss juggling requires more balls than hands. Thus tricks such as the one ball cascade toss back and forth, 300, for example, may not be considered valid patterns. Throws back and forth shower style, odd numbers, are the most common one prop practice. Invalid or practice patterns and tricks are marked with an X.

The numbers are as follows:
0 = "missing"/rest [empty hand]
1 = pass [between hands]
2 = hold [one hand/no toss]
3 = (3-ball) cascade toss [between hands]
4 = (4-ball) fountain or columns toss [up and into same hand]
5 = high toss [between hands]
...
a = 10 = high columns/fountain toss
...

Symbols:

Number: Relative height of a toss. 1, 2, 3...
Brackets []: Multiplex. [333]33.
Chevrons and vertical bar <|>: Simultaneous and passing patterns.
P: Pass. <333P|333P>
Fraction: Pass 1/y beats later. <4.5 3 3 | 3 4 3.5>
Parentheses: Synchronous pattern.
 *: Synchronous pattern that switches sides. (4,2x)(2x,4) = (4,2x)*
x: Toss to the other hand during a synchronous pattern.

Asynchronous

A pattern is symmetrical (S) if both hands play the same role and asymmetrical (A) if not. All asynchronous patterns whose periods are odd are symmetrical, and all asynchronous patterns whose periods are even are asymmetrical.

Synchronous
A pattern is symmetric if all throws made by the right hand are made by the left hand in the same order. It follows that a synchronous pattern is symmetric if the sequence of throws made by one hand in the siteswap notation is a rotation of the other.

Passing

Ladder diagrams

References

External links
Siteswap.org

Juggling patterns and tricks
Entertainment lists